The 2016 Tampa Bay Rays season was the Rays' 19th season of Major League Baseball and the ninth as the "Rays" (all at Tropicana Field). After starting the season 31–32, the Rays went 37–62 across their final 100 games, including a dismal 3–24 stretch before the All-Star Break, to finish at 68–94, their worst record since the 2007 season.

In March 2016, the Rays traveled to Cuba to play an exhibition game against the Cuba national baseball team to accompany Barack Obama's visit to Cuba, the first United States presidential visit to Cuba in 88 years. It was a landmark in Cuba–United States relations. With Obama and Raúl Castro in attendance, the Rays beat Cuba 4–1.

Season standings

American League East

American League Wild Card

Record against opponents

Regular season summary

Game log

|- bgcolor="ffbbbb"
| 1 || April 3 || Blue Jays || 3–5 || Stroman (1–0) || Archer (0–1) || Osuna (1) || 31,042 || 0–1 || L1
|- bgcolor="ffbbbb"
| 2 || April 4 || Blue Jays || 3–5 || Dickey (1–0) || Smyly (0–1) || Osuna (2) || 15,116 || 0–2 || L2
|- bgcolor="bbffbb"
| 3 || April 5 || Blue Jays || 3–2 || Colomé (1–0) || Cecil (0–1) || — || 12,757 || 1–2 || W1
|- bgcolor="bbffbb"
| 4 || April 6 || Blue Jays || 5–3 || Ramírez (1–0) || Floyd (0–1) || — || 14,257 || 2–2 || W2
|- bgcolor="ffbbbb"
| 5 || April 8 || @ Orioles || 1–6 || Tillman (1–0) || Archer (0–2) || — || 17,304 || 2–3 || L1
|- bgcolor="bbbbbb"
| — || April 9 || @ Orioles || colspan=7|Postponed (snow); Makeup: June 25
|- bgcolor="ffbbbb"
| 6 || April 10 || @ Orioles || 3–5 || Brach (1–0) || Odorizzi (0–1) || Britton (2) || 23,101 || 2–4 || L2
|- bgcolor="bbffbb"
| 7 || April 12 || Indians || 5–1 || Cedeño (1–0) || Kluber (0–2) || — || 10,283 || 3–4 || W1
|- bgcolor="ffbbbb"
| 8 || April 13 || Indians || 1–4 || Carrasco (1–0) || Smyly (0–2) || Allen (2) || 10,117 || 3–5 || L1
|- bgcolor="ffbbbb"
| 9 || April 14 || Indians || 0–6 || Salazar (2–0) || Archer (0–3) || — || 10,715 || 3–6 || L2
|- bgcolor="ffbbbb"
| 10 || April 15 || White Sox || 0–1 || Sale (3–0) || Colomé (1–1) || — || 16,801 || 3–7 || L3
|- bgcolor="bbffbb"
| 11 || April 16 || White Sox || 7–2 || Ramírez (2–0) || Danks (0–2) || — || 30,451 || 4–7 || W1
|- bgcolor="bbffbb"
| 12 || April 17 || White Sox || 3–2 || Moore (1–0) || Quintana (1–1) || Colomé (1) || 21,810 || 5–7 || W2
|- bgcolor="bbffbb"
| 13 || April 19 || @ Red Sox || 3–0  || Ramírez (3–0) || Barnes (1–1) || Colomé (2) || 32,061 || 6–7 || W3
|- bgcolor="ffbbbb"
| 14 || April 20 || @ Red Sox || 3–7 || Porcello (3–0) || Archer (0–4) || — || 31,689 || 6–8 || L1
|- bgcolor="bbffbb"
| 15 || April 21 || @ Red Sox || 12–8 || Ramírez (4–0) || Cuevas (0–1) || Colomé (3) || 37,954 || 7–8 || W1
|- bgcolor="ffbbbb"
| 16 || April 22 || @ Yankees || 3–6 || Nova (1–0) || Moore (1–1) || Miller (4) || 31,843 || 7–9 || L1
|- bgcolor="ffbbbb"
| 17 || April 23 || @ Yankees || 2–3 || Miller (1–0) || Ramírez (4–1) || — || 40,714 || 7–10 || L2
|- bgcolor="bbffbb"
| 18 || April 24 || @ Yankees || 8–1 || Smyly (1–2) || Pineda (1–2) || — || 40,981 || 8–10 || W1
|- bgcolor="bbffbb"
| 19 || April 25 || Orioles || 2–0 || Archer (1–4) || Gausman (0–1) || Colomé (4) || 12,996 || 9–10 || W2
|- bgcolor="bbffbb"
| 20 || April 26 || Orioles || 3–1 || Romero (1–0) || Jiménez (1–2) || Colomé (5) || 10,988 || 10–10 || W3
|- bgcolor="ffbbbb"
| 21 || April 27 || Orioles || 1–3 || Tillman (2–1) || Moore (1–2) || Britton (5) || 11,850 || 10–11 || L1
|- bgcolor="ffbbbb"
| 22 || April 29 || Blue Jays || 1–6 || Sanchez (2–1) || Smyly (1–3) || — || 13,679 || 10–12 || L2
|- bgcolor="bbffbb"
| 23 || April 30 || Blue Jays || 4–3 || Cedeño (2–0) || Cecil (0–5) || — || 14,948 || 11–12 || W1
|-

|- bgcolor="ffbbbb"
| 24 || May 1 || Blue Jays || 1–5 || Stroman (4–0) || Cedeño (2–1) || — || 27,217 || 11–13 || L1
|- bgcolor="ffbbbb"
| 25 || May 3 || Dodgers || 5–10 || Kazmir (2–2) || Moore (1–3) || Jansen (10) || 14,116 || 11–14 || L2
|- bgcolor="bbffbb"
| 26 || May 4 || Dodgers || 8–5 || Ramírez (5–1) || Wood (1–3) || Colomé (6) || 13,226 || 12–14 || W1
|- bgcolor="bbffbb"
| 27 || May 6 || @ Angels || 5–2 || Archer (2–4) || Rasmus (0–2) || Colomé (7) || 41,253 || 13–14 || W2
|- bgcolor="bbffbb"
| 28 || May 7 || @ Angels || 4–2 || Ramírez (6–1) || Smith (0–2) || Colomé (8) || 40,142 || 14–14 || W3
|- bgcolor="bbffbb"
| 29 || May 8 || @ Angels || 3–1 || Andriese (1–0) || Tropeano (1–2) || Colomé (9) || 41,086 || 15–14 || W4
|- bgcolor="ffbbbb"
| 30 || May 9 || @ Mariners || 2–5 || Hernandez (3–2) || Eveland (0–1) || Cishek (10) || 15,230 || 15–15 || L1
|- bgcolor="ffbbbb"
| 31 || May 10 || @ Mariners || 4–6 || Miley (3–2) || Smyly (1–4) || Cishek (11) || 16,013 || 15–16 || L2
|- bgcolor="ffbbbb"
| 32 || May 11 || @ Mariners || 5–6  || Johnson (1–0) || Geltz (0–1) || — || 23,000 || 15–17 || L3
|- bgcolor="ffbbbb"
| 33 || May 13 || Athletics || 3–6 || Hill (5–3) || Odorizzi (0–2) || Madson (9) || 14,604 || 15–18 || L4
|- bgcolor="bbffbb"
| 34 || May 14 || Athletics || 6–0 || Andriese (2–0) || Graveman (1–5) || — || 28,158 || 16–18 || W1
|- bgcolor="ffbbbb"
| 35 || May 15 || Athletics || 6–7 || Axford (3–1) || Geltz (0–2) || Madson (10) || 19,545 || 16–19 || L1
|- bgcolor="bbffbb"
| 36 || May 16 || @ Blue Jays || 13–2 || Smyly (2–4) || Happ (5–1) || — || 26,516 || 17–19 || W1
|- bgcolor="bbffbb"
| 37 || May 17 || @ Blue Jays || 12–2 || Archer (3–4) || Stroman (4–1) || — || 27,521 || 18–19 || W2
|- bgcolor="bbffbb"
| 38 || May 18 || @ Blue Jays || 6–3 || Odorizzi (1–2) || Dickey (2–5) || Colomé (10) || 29,078 || 19–19 || W3
|- bgcolor="bbffbb"
| 39 || May 20 || @ Tigers || 7–5 || Andriese (3–0) || Sánchez (3–5) || Colomé (11) || 30,304 || 20–19 || W4
|- bgcolor="ffbbbb"
| 40 || May 21 || @ Tigers || 4–5 || Fulmer (3–1) || Smyly (2–5) || Rodríguez (12) || 32,316 || 20–20 || L1
|- bgcolor="ffbbbb"
| 41 || May 22 || @ Tigers || 4–9 || Zimmermann (7–2) || Archer (3–5) || — || 34,758 || 20–21 || L2
|- bgcolor="ffbbbb"
| 42 || May 23 || @ Marlins || 6–7 || Phelps (3–2) || Ramírez (6–2) || Ramos (14) || 17,969 || 20–22 || L3
|- bgcolor="bbffbb"
| 43 || May 24 || @ Marlins || 4–3 || Odorizzi (2–2) || Koehler (2–5) || Colomé (12) || 23,709 || 21–22 || W1
|- bgcolor="ffbbbb"
| 44 || May 25 || Marlins || 3–4 || Barraclough (3–1) || Sturdevant (0–1) || Ramos (15) || 13,554 || 21–23 || L1
|- bgcolor="ffbbbb"
| 45 || May 26 || Marlins || 1–9 || Fernández (7–2) || Smyly (2–6) || — || 11,399 || 21–24 || L2
|- bgcolor="ffbbbb"
| 46 || May 27 || Yankees || 4–1 || Tanaka (3–0) || Archer (3–6) || — || 14,697 || 21–25 || L3
|- bgcolor="bbffbb"
| 47 || May 28 || Yankees || 9–5 || Moore (2–3) || Pineda (2–6) || — || 20,188 || 22–25 || W1
|- bgcolor="ffbbbb"
| 48 || May 29 || Yankees || 1–2 || Eovaldi (6–2) || Odorizzi (2–3) || Chapman (7) || 19,748 || 22–26 || L1
|- bgcolor="ffbbbb"
| 49 || May 30 || @ Royals || 2–6 || Herrera (1–1) || Ramírez (6–3) || — || 32,018 || 22–27 || L2
|- bgcolor="ffbbbb"
| 50 || May 31 || @ Royals || 5–10 || Gee (2–2) || Smyly (2–7) || Davis (15) || 26,006 || 22–28 || L3
|-

|- bgcolor="ffbbbb"
| 51 || June 1 || @ Royals || 3–6 || Duffy (1–0) || Archer (3–7) || Davis (16) || 30,554 || 22–29 || L4
|- bgcolor="ffbbbb"
| 52 || June 2 || @ Twins || 4–6 || Rogers (1–0) || Ramírez (6–4) || Jepsen (7) || 20,193 || 22–30 || L5
|- bgcolor="bbffbb"
| 53 || June 3 || @ Twins || 4–2 || Ramírez (7–4) || Nolasco (2–4) || Colomé (13) || 21,134 || 23–30 || W1
|- bgcolor="bbffbb"
| 54 || June 4 || @ Twins || 7–4 || Andriese (4–0) || Santana (1–5) || Colomé (14) || 26,613 || 24–30 || W2
|- bgcolor="bbffbb"
| 55 || June 5 || @ Twins || 7–5 || Cedeño (3–1) || Jepsen (2–5) || Colomé (15) || 25,510 || 25–30 || W3
|- bgcolor="bbffbb"
| 56 || June 6 || @ Diamondbacks || 6–4 || Archer (4–7) || Ray (2–5) || Colomé (16) || 17,176 || 26–30 || W4
|- bgcolor="ffbbbb"
| 57 || June 7 || @ Diamondbacks || 0–5 || Greinke (8–3) || Moore (2–4) || — || 17,964 || 26–31 || L1
|- bgcolor="bbffbb"
| 58 || June 8 || @ Diamondbacks || 6–3 || Odorizzi (3–3) || Bradley (2–2) || Colomé (17) || 16,954 || 27–31 || W1
|- bgcolor="bbffbb"
| 59 || June 10 || Astros || 4–3 || Andriese (5–0) || McCullers Jr. (3–2) || Colomé (18) || 13,075 || 28–31 || W2
|- bgcolor="ffbbbb"
| 60 || June 11 || Astros || 3–4 || Fiers (4–3) || Archer (4–8) || Harris (3) || 19,658 || 28–32 || L1
|- bgcolor="bbffbb"
| 61 || June 12 || Astros || 5–0 || Moore (3–4) || Keuchel (3–9) || — || 11,168 || 29–32 || W1
|- bgcolor="bbffbb"
| 62 || June 14 || Mariners || 8–7 || Garton (1–0) || Montgomery (2–2) || Colomé (19) || 11,455 || 30–32 || W2
|- bgcolor="bbffbb"
| 63 || June 15 || Mariners || 3–2  || Andriese (6–0) || Montgomery (2–3) || — || 12,239 || 31–32 || W3
|- bgcolor="ffbbbb"
| 64 || June 16 || Mariners || 4–6 || Paxton (1–2) || Snell (0–1) || Cishek (15) || 11,331 || 31–33 || L1
|- bgcolor="ffbbbb"
| 65 || June 17 || Giants || 1–5 || Samardzija (8–4) || Archer (4–9) || — || 40,135 || 31–34 || L2
|- bgcolor="ffbbbb"
| 66 || June 18 || Giants || 4–6 || Strickland (3–0) || Colomé (1–2) || Gearrin (2) || 23,948 || 31–35 || L3
|- bgcolor="ffbbbb"
| 67 || June 19 || Giants || 1–5 || Law (2–1) || Cedeño (3–2) || — || 17,361 || 31–36 || L4
|- bgcolor="ffbbbb"
| 68 || June 20 || @ Indians || 4–7 || Shaw (1–3) || Ramírez (7–5) || Allen (14) || 13,811 || 31–37 || L5
|- bgcolor="ffbbbb"
| 69 || June 21 || @ Indians || 0–6 || Kluber (7–7) || Snell (0–2) || — || 15,629 || 31–38 || L6
|- bgcolor="ffbbbb"
| 70 || June 22 || @ Indians || 1–6 || Bauer (5–2) || Archer (4–10) || — || 21,216 || 31–39 || L7
|- bgcolor="ffbbbb"
| 71 || June 24 || @ Orioles || 3–6 || Tolliver (1–0) || Moore (3–5) || Britton (22) || 44,956 || 31–40 || L8
|- bgcolor="ffbbbb"
| 72 || June 25  || @ Orioles || 0–5 || Gausman (1–5) || Andriese (6–1) || — || 18,229 || 31–41 || L9
|- bgcolor="ffbbbb"
| 73 || June 25  || @ Orioles || 6–8 || McFarland (2–2) || Ramírez (7–6) || Britton (23) || 33,040 || 31–42 || L10
|- bgcolor="ffbbbb"
| 74 || June 26 || @ Orioles || 5–12 || Wilson (4–5) || Smyly (2–8) || — || 38,611 || 31–43 || L11
|- bgcolor="bbffbb"
| 75 || June 27 || Red Sox || 13–7 || Snell (1–2) || Rodríguez (1–3) || — || 18,024 || 32–43 || W1
|- bgcolor="ffbbbb"
| 76 || June 28 || Red Sox || 2–8 || Porcello (9–2) || Archer (4–11) || — || 16,986 || 32–44 || L1
|- bgcolor="bbffbb"
| 77 || June 29 || Red Sox || 4–0 || Moore (4–5) || Price (8–5) || — || 24,110 || 33–44 || W1
|- bgcolor="ffbbbb"
| 78 || June 30 || Tigers || 7–10 || Sánchez (5–8) || Ramírez (7–7) || Rodríguez (22) || 10,729 || 33–45 || L1
|-

|- bgcolor="ffbbbb"
| 79 || July 1 || Tigers || 2–10 || Fulmer (8–2) || Smyly (2–9) || — || 13,537 || 33–46 || L2
|- bgcolor="ffbbbb"
| 80 || July 2 || Tigers || 2–3 || Verlander (8–6) || Snell (1–3) || Rodriguez (23)|| 17,861 || 33–47 || L3
|- bgcolor="ffbbbb"
| 81 || July 3 || Tigers || 1–5 || Rondón (2–0) || Andriese (6–2) || — || 13,126 || 33–48 || L4
|- bgcolor="bbffbb"
| 82 || July 4 || Angels || 4–2 || Moore (5–5) || Salas (3–6) || Garton (1) || 14,532 || 34–48 || W1
|- bgcolor="ffbbbb"
| 83 || July 5 || Angels || 5–13 || Guerra (2–0) || Odorizzi (3–4) || — || 14,896 || 34–49 || L1
|- bgcolor="ffbbbb"
| 84 || July 6 || Angels || 2–7 || Weaver (7–7) || Smyly (2–10) || — || 11,267 || 34–50 || L2
|- bgcolor="ffbbbb"
| 85 || July 7 || Angels || 1–5 || Santiago (6–4) || Snell (1–4) || — || 14,576 || 34–51 || L3
|- bgcolor="ffbbbb"
| 86 || July 8 || @ Red Sox || 5–6 || Ross Jr. (1–1) || Archer (4–12) || Uehara (3) || 37,739 || 34–52 || L4
|- bgcolor="ffbbbb"
| 87 || July 9 || @ Red Sox || 1–4 || Porcello (11–2) || Moore (5–6) || Uehara (4) || 36,900 || 34–53 || L5
|- bgcolor="ffbbbb"
| 88 || July 10 || @ Red Sox || 0–4 || Price (9–6) || Odorizzi (3–5) || — || 36,669 || 34–54 || L6
|- style="text-align:center; background:#bbcaff;"
| colspan="10" | 87th All-Star Game in San Diego, California
|- bgcolor="ffbbbb"
| 89 || July 15 || Orioles || 3–4 || Givens (7–1) || Archer (4–13) || Britton (28) || 17,672 || 34–55 || L7
|- bgcolor="ffbbbb"
| 90 || July 16 || Orioles || 1–2 || Tillman (13–2) || Moore (5–7) || Britton (29) || 18,638 || 34–56 || L8
|- bgcolor="bbffbb"
| 91 || July 17 || Orioles || 5–2 || Odorizzi (4–5) || Bundy (2–2) || Colomé (20) || 16,161 || 35–56 || W1
|- bgcolor="ffbbbb"
| 92 || July 18 || @ Rockies || 4–7 || Anderson (2–3) || Smyly (2–11) || Estévez || 30,601 || 35–57 || L1
|- bgcolor="bbffbb"
| 93 || July 19 || @ Rockies || 10–1 || Snell (2–4) || Chatwood (8–6) || Andriese (1) || 33,061 || 36–57 || W1
|- bgcolor="bbffbb"
| 94 || July 20 || @ Rockies || 11–3 || Archer (5–13) || de la Rosa (6–7) || — || 31,456 || 37–57 || W2
|- bgcolor="bbffbb"
| 95 || July 21 || @ Athletics || 7–3 || Moore (6–7) || Gray (4–9) || Colomé (21) || 14,412 || 38–57 || W3
|- bgcolor="ffbbbb"
| 96 || July 22 || @ Athletics || 0–1  || Axford (4–3) || Floro (0–1) || — || 15,250 || 38–58 || L1
|- bgcolor="ffbbbb"
| 97 || July 23 || @ Athletics || 3–4 || Graveman (7–6) || Colomé (1–3) || — || 30,436 || 38–59 || L2
|- bgcolor="ffbbbb"
| 98 || July 24 || @ Athletics || 2–3 || Dull (4–2) || Ramírez (7–8) || Madson (21) || 17,642 || 38–60 || L3
|- bgcolor="ffbbbb"
| 99 || July 26 || @ Dodgers || 2–3 || Norris (6–9) || Archer (5–14) || Jansen (30) || 46,960 || 38–61 || L4
|- bgcolor="bbffbb"
| 100 || July 27 || @ Dodgers || 3–1 || Moore (7–7) || McCarthy (2–1) || Colomé (22) || 43,576 || 39–61 || W1
|- bgcolor="bbffbb"
| 101 || July 29 || Yankees || 5–1 || Odorizzi (5–5) || Nova (7–6) || Colomé (23) || 17,856 || 40–61 || W2
|- bgcolor="bbffbb"
| 102 || July 30 || Yankees || 6–3 || Smyly (3–11) || Eovaldi (9–7) || Colomé (24) || 25,883 || 41–61 || W3
|- bgcolor="bbffbb"
| 103 || July 31 || Yankees || 5–3 || Snell (3–4) || Pineda (5–10) || Colomé (25) || 18,109 || 42–61 || W4
|-

|- bgcolor="ffbbbb"
| 104 || August 1 || Royals || 0–3 || Duffy (7–1) || Archer (5–15) || Herrera (2) || 13,976 || 42–62 || L1
|- bgcolor="ffbbbb"
| 105 || August 2 || Royals || 2–3 || Young (3–8) || Cedeño (3–3) || Herrera (3) || 12,625 || 42–63 || L2
|- bgcolor="bbffbb"
| 106 || August 3 || Royals || 12–0 || Odorizzi (6–5) || Vólquez (8–10) || — || 11,149 || 43–63 || W1
|- bgcolor="bbffbb"
| 107 || August 4 || Royals || 3–2 || Boxberger (1–0) || Soria (4–5) || Colomé (26) || 13,120 || 44–63 || W2
|- bgcolor="ffbbbb"
| 108 || August 5 || Twins || 2–6 || Santana (5–9) || Ramírez (7–9) || — || 12,161 || 44–64 || L1
|- bgcolor="bbffbb"
| 109 || August 6 || Twins || 7–3 || Archer (6–15) || Berríos (2–2) || Colomé (27) || 15,603 || 45–64 || W1
|- bgcolor="ffbbbb"
| 110 || August 7 || Twins || 3–6 || Gibson (4–6) || Andriese (6–3) || Kintzler (9) || 12,649 || 45–65 || L1
|- bgcolor="ffbbbb"
| 111 || August 8 || @ Blue Jays || 5–7 || Benoit (2–1) || Cedeño (3–4) || Osuna (25) || 43,812 || 45–66 || L2
|- bgcolor="bbffbb"
| 112 || August 9 || @ Blue Jays || 9–2 || Smyly (4–11) || Estrada (7–5) || Ramírez (1) || 43,134 || 46–66 || W1
|- bgcolor="ffbbbb"
| 113 || August 10 || @ Blue Jays || 0–7 || Happ (16–3) || Snell (3–5) || — || 45,501 || 46–67 || L1
|- bgcolor="ffbbbb"
| 114 || August 12 || @ Yankees || 3–6 || Sabathia (7–9) || Archer (6–16) || Betances (4) || 46,459 || 46–68 || L2
|- bgcolor="ffbbbb"
| 115 || August 13 || @ Yankees || 4–8 || Tanaka (9–4) || Andriese (6–4) || — || 41,682 || 46–69 || L3
|- bgcolor="bbffbb"
| 116 || August 14 || @ Yankees || 12–3 || Odorizzi (7–5) || Severino (1–8) || — || 41,473 || 47–69 || W1
|- bgcolor="bbffbb"
| 117 || August 15 || Padres || 8–2 || Smyly (5–11) || Perdomo (5–7) || — || 10,417 || 48–69 || W2
|- bgcolor="bbffbb"
| 118 || August 16 || Padres || 15–1 || Snell (4–5) || Jackson (3–3) || — || 10,793 || 49–69 || W3
|- bgcolor="bbffbb"
| 119 || August 17 || Padres || 2–0 || Archer (7–16) || Friedrich (4–9) || Colomé (28) || 10,251 || 50–69 || W4
|- bgcolor="ffbbbb"
| 120 || August 19 || Rangers || 2–6 || Hamels (13–4) || Andriese (6–5) || — || 15,109 || 50–70 || L1
|- bgcolor="bbffbb"
| 121 || August 20 || Rangers || 8–2 || Odorizzi (8–5) || Griffin (5–3) || — || 16,505 || 51–70 || W1
|- bgcolor="bbffbb"
| 122 || August 21 || Rangers || 8–4 || Smyly (6–11) || Pérez (8–9) || — || 17,685 || 52–70 || W2
|- bgcolor="ffbbbb"
| 123 || August 22 || Red Sox || 2–6 || Price (12–8) || Snell (4–6) || — || 13,576 || 52–71 || L1
|- bgcolor="ffbbbb"
| 124 || August 23 || Red Sox || 1–2 || Buchholz (5–9) || Archer (7–17) || Kimbrel (23) || 11,249 || 52–72 || L2
|- bgcolor="bbffbb"
| 125 || August 24 || Red Sox || 4–3  || Boxberger (2–0) || Hembree (4–1) || — || 11,896 || 53–72 || W1
|- bgcolor="bbffbb"
| 126 || August 25 || Red Sox || 2–1 || Odorizzi (9–5) || Pomeranz (10–10) || Romero (1) || 12,059 || 54–72 || W2
|- bgcolor="ffbbbb"
| 127 || August 26 || @ Astros || 4–5 || Giles (2–3) || Colomé (1–4) || — || 25,852 || 54–73 || L1
|- bgcolor="ffbbbb"
| 128 || August 27 || @ Astros || 2–6 || Keuchel (9–12) || Snell (4–7) || — || 36,544 || 54–74 || L2
|- bgcolor="bbffbb"
| 129 || August 28 || @ Astros || 10–4 || Archer (8–17) || Fister (12–9) || — || 37,484 || 55–74 || W1
|- bgcolor="ffbbbb"
| 130 || August 29 || @ Red Sox || 4–9 || Porcello (18–3) || Andriese (6–6) || — || 36,948 || 55–75 || L1
|- bgcolor="bbffbb"
| 131 || August 30 || @ Red Sox || 4–3 || Romero (2–0) || Buchholz (5–10) || Colomé (29) || 37,083 || 56–75 || W1
|- bgcolor="ffbbbb"
| 132 || August 31 || @ Red Sox || 6–8 || Tazawa (3–2) || Ramírez (7–10) || Kimbrel (24) || 36,786 || 56–76 || L1
|-

|- bgcolor="bbffbb"
| 133 || September 2 || Blue Jays || 8–3 || Farquhar (1–0) || Stroman (9–6) || — || 12,602 || 57–76 || W1
|- bgcolor="bbffbb"
| 134 || September 3 || Blue Jays || 7–5 || Snell (5–7) || Estrada (8–7) || Colomé (30) || 14,353 || 58–76 || W2
|- bgcolor="ffbbbb"
| 135 || September 4 || Blue Jays || 3–5 || Benoit (3–1) || Jepsen (2–6) || Osuna (30) || 13,884 || 58–77 || L1
|- bgcolor="ffbbbb"
| 136 || September 5 || Orioles || 3–7 || Jiménez (6–11) || Andriese (6–7) || — || 12,256 || 58–78 || L2
|- bgcolor="ffbbbb"
| 137 || September 6 || Orioles || 2–11 || Gallardo (5–7) || Odorizzi (9–6) || — || 12,207 || 58–79 || L3
|- bgcolor="bbffbb"
| 138 || September 7 || Orioles || 7–6 || Boxberger (3–0) || Givens (8–2) || Colomé (31) || 10,537 || 59–79 || W1
|- bgcolor="ffbbbb"
| 139 || September 8 || @ Yankees || 4–5 || Layne (2–1) || Ramírez (7–11) || — || 27,631 || 59–80 || L1
|- bgcolor="ffbbbb"
| 140 || September 9 || @ Yankees || 5–7 || Warren (5–3) || Snell (5–8) || Betances (10) || 30,194 || 59–81 || L2
|- bgcolor="ffbbbb"
| 141 || September 10 || @ Yankees || 1–5 || Tanaka (13–4) || Archer (8–18) || — || 33,460 || 59–82 || L3
|- bgcolor="bbffbb"
| 142 || September 11 || @ Yankees || 4–2 || Andriese (7–7) || Cessa (4–1) || Colomé (32) || 33,087 || 60–82 || W1
|- bgcolor="ffbbbb"
| 143 || September 12 || @ Blue Jays || 2–3 || Grilli (6–5) || Boxberger (3–1) || Osuna (32) || 35,333 || 60–83 || L1
|- bgcolor="bbffbb"
| 144 || September 13 || @ Blue Jays || 6–2 || Smyly (7–11) || Stroman (9–8) || — || 38,338 || 61–83 || W1
|- bgcolor="bbffbb"
| 145 || September 14 || @ Blue Jays || 8–1 || Cobb (1–0) || Estrada (8–9) || — || 41,001 || 62–83 || W2
|- bgcolor="bbffbb"
| 146 || September 15 || @ Orioles || 7–6 || Boxberger (4–1) || Gallardo (5–8) || Colomé (33) || 19,233 || 63–83 || W3
|- bgcolor="ffbbbb"
| 147 || September 16 || @ Orioles || 4–5 || Brach (9–3) || Boxberger (4–2) || Britton (44) || 30,094 || 63–84 || L1
|- bgcolor="bbffbb"
| 148 || September 17 || @ Orioles || 5–2 || Andriese (8–7) || Tillman (16–6) || Colomé (34) || 27,823 || 64–84 || W1
|- bgcolor="ffbbbb"
| 149 || September 18 || @ Orioles || 1–2 || Brach (10–3) || Garton (1–1) || Britton (45) || 28,427 || 64–85 || L1
|- bgcolor="ffbbbb"
| 150 || September 20 || Yankees || 3–5 || Severino (3–8) || Boxberger (4–3) || Betances (12) || 12,732 || 64–86 || L2
|- bgcolor="ffbbbb"
| 151 || September 21 ||Yankees || 5–11 || Tanaka (14–4) || Cobb (1–1) || — || 12,192 || 64–87 || L3
|- bgcolor="bbffbb"
| 152 || September 22 || Yankees || 2–0 || Snell (6–8) || Cessa (4–3) || Colomé (35) || 13,355 || 65–87 || W1
|- bgcolor="ffbbbb"
| 153 || September 23 || Red Sox || 1–2 || Pomeranz (11–12) || Archer (8–19) || Ziegler (22) || 20,543 || 65–88 || L1
|- bgcolor="ffbbbb"
| 154 || September 24 || Red Sox || 4–6 || Porcello (22–4) || Garton (1–2) || Kimbrel (30) || 25,641 || 65–89 || L2
|- bgcolor="ffbbbb"
| 155 || September 25 || Red Sox || 2–3  || Kelly (4–0) || Gamboa (0–1) || — || 26,443 || 65–90 || L3
|- bgcolor="ffbbbb"
| 156 || September 26 || @ White Sox || 1–7 || Shields (6–18) || Smyly (7–12) || — || 13,655 || 65–91 || L4
|- bgcolor="ffbbbb"
| 157 || September 27 || @ White Sox || 6–13 || Sale (17–9) || Cobb (1–2) || — || 14,798 || 65–92 || L5
|- bgcolor="ffbbbb"
| 158 || September 28 || @ White Sox || 0–1 || González (5–8) || Gamboa (0–2) || Robertson (37) || 12,976 || 65–93 || L6
|- bgcolor="bbffbb"
| 159 || September 29 || @ White Sox || 5–3 || Archer (9–19) || Quintana (13–12) || Colomé (36) || 14,792 || 66–93 || W1
|- bgcolor="ffbbbb"
| 160 || September 30 || @ Rangers || 1–3 || Darvish (7–5) || Andriese (8–8) || Dyson (38) || 35,968 || 66–94 || L1
|-

|- bgcolor="bbffbb"
| 161 || October 1 || @ Rangers || 4–1 || Odorizzi (10–6) || Lewis (6–5) || Colomé (37) || 42,093 || 67–94 || W1
|- bgcolor="bbffbb"
| 162 || October 2 || @ Rangers || 6–4  || Colomé (2–4) || Scheppers (1–1) || Ramírez (2) || 37,015 || 68–94 || W2
|-

|- style="text-align:center;"
| Legend:       = Win       = Loss       = PostponementBold = Rays team member

Roster

Farm system

References

External links

2016 Tampa Bay Rays season Official Site 
2016 Tampa Bay Rays season at ESPN
2016 Tampa Bay Rays season at Baseball Reference

Tampa Bay Rays season
Tampa Bay Rays
Tampa Bay Rays seasons